Allan Cunningham Kelton (June 24, 1846 – November 22, 1928) was an American officer serving in the United States Marine Corps during the Spanish–American War who was one of 23 Marine Corps officers approved to receive the Marine Corps Brevet Medal for bravery. He was commissioned in the Marine Corps in 1869.

Presidential citation
Citation
The President of the United States takes pleasure in presenting the Marine Corps Brevet Medal to Allan Cunningham Kelton, Captain, U.S. Marine Corps, for distinguished conduct and public service in the presence of the enemy at Guantanamo, Cuba, 11 June 1898. On 18 March 1901, appointed Major, by brevet.

See also

References
General
 
 
 

Specific

1846 births
1928 deaths
United States Marine Corps officers
American people of the Spanish–American War
Military personnel from Philadelphia